Brad Bekkedahl (born November 23, 1957) is an American politician who has served in the North Dakota Senate from the 1st district since 2014.

References

1957 births
Living people
Republican Party North Dakota state senators
People from Williston, North Dakota
21st-century American politicians